Gareloi or Anangusook is a volcanic island in the Delarof Islands of the Aleutian Islands of Alaska. It is located between the Tanaga Pass and the Amchitka Pass.

On the other side of a small saddle lies another peak of the island however it does not equal the height of Mount Gareloi. The island is uninhabited.

Coastal cliffs provide nesting habitat for more than 600,000 seabirds, mostly for crevice nesting auklets. Least Auklets account for 62% of the colony, Crested Auklets for 30%, and Parakeet Auklets for 6%. Each of these species is present on the island in numbers exceeding 1% of their global populations.

The island consists of lava rock, black lava, eroded lava, and ashes; the lower slopes and valleys are covered with grass and tundra in many places. The shores have steep cliffs with rocks and boulders at the base; boulders, pinnacles, and rocks awash extend around the shoreline. Depths of 10 fathoms or more are within  of the island. A trapper's hut is on the beach above the N shore of Gareloi Island.

Gareloi Volcano had four confirmed eruptions in the 1980s and one unconfirmed eruption in 1996. All but one of them were considered explosive eruptions. In Spring and Summer 2007 there was a period of increased seismic activity on Gareloi Island, sometimes reaching 40 earthquakes per day.

References

Further reading
Gareloi Island: Block 1136, Census Tract 1, Aleutians West Census Area, Alaska United States Census Bureau

External links
 Gareloi Volcano Photographs from Gareloi Island, July 2008.
 

Landforms of Aleutians West Census Area, Alaska
Delarof Islands
Volcanoes of Alaska
Uninhabited islands of Alaska
Volcanoes of Unorganized Borough, Alaska
Stratovolcanoes of the United States
Islands of Alaska
Islands of Unorganized Borough, Alaska